Paul Jean Keller (22 June 1905 – 5 May 1990) was a French middle-distance runner, who competed at the 1924, 1928 and 1932 Summer Olympics. In 1924 he finished fourth in the team 3000 m event. Four years later he placed eighth in the 800 m and 11th in the 1500 m. In 1932 he was eliminated in the heats of the 800 m event. He finished ninth in the 800 m at the 1934 European Championships.

References

1905 births
1990 deaths
French male middle-distance runners
Olympic athletes of France
Athletes (track and field) at the 1924 Summer Olympics
Athletes (track and field) at the 1928 Summer Olympics
Athletes (track and field) at the 1932 Summer Olympics
Athletes from Paris
20th-century French people